Sir Edward Hungerford, KB (20 October 1632 – 1711), was an English politician who sat in the House of Commons between 1659 and 1702. He was famous for his profligate ways and sold thirty manors, including the family seat at Farleigh Hungerford, to fund his extravagant lifestyle. He founded Hungerford Market at Charing Cross as a commercial venture.

Origins
Hungerford was the son and heir of Anthony Hungerford (1607/8-1657) by his wife Rachel Jones, daughter of Rice Jones of Asthall, Oxfordshire and was baptised at Black Bourton, Oxfordshire. His father was a supporter of the royalist cause in the Civil War. Hungerford was a student of Queen's College, Oxford, in 1649. He succeeded to the family estates on the death of his father in 1657.

Career
In 1658 Hungerford was elected Member of Parliament for Chippenham in the Third Protectorate Parliament. He was elected MP for Chippenham in 1660 for the Convention Parliament. He was made a Knight of the Bath at the coronation of King Charles II on 23 April 1661. 

In 1661, he was elected for Chippenham again in the Cavalier Parliament but the election was declared void. He was then re-elected in the by-election later in 1661 and also in the two elections in 1679. In January 1680 he presented a petition for the summoning of a parliament, and his avowed opposition to the court party of King Charles II led to his removal as Lord Lieutenant of his county in May 1681.  

He settled in  Spring Gardens, Whitehall, in 1681 and was elected MP for Chippenham again in the Oxford Parliament of 1681. He was implicated in the 1683 Rye House Plot and his home at Farleigh Castle was searched for arms. He was elected MP for New Shoreham in 1685, 1688, and 1690, and for Steyning in 1695, 1698, 1700, and 1702.

Hungerford obtained some reputation as a patron of archery, and was lieutenant-colonel of the Regiment of Archers in 1661, and colonel in 1682. However, he was best known for his reckless extravagance. He is said to have disposed of thirty manors in all. By way of restoring his waning fortunes, he obtained permission in 1679 to hold a market, on Mondays, Wednesdays, and Saturdays on the site of the demolished Hungerford House and grounds. The house, which stood on the site of the present Charing Cross railway station, had been his family's London town house and had been destroyed by fire in April 1669.). In 1682 a market-house was erected there, apparently to the design of Sir Christopher Wren. A bust of Sir Edward was placed on the north front, with an inscription stating that the market had been built at his expense with the king's sanction. In 1685 Sir Stephen Fox and Sir Christopher Wren purchased the market and received the tolls. The market-house was rebuilt in 1833, and was removed in 1860, when Charing Cross railway station was built on the site, Hungerford sold the manor and his seat at Farleigh Castle in 1686 to Henry Baynton of Spye Park for £56,000, so ending centuries of ownership by the Hungerford family. In about 1700 it was purchased by Joseph Houlton of Trowbridge, in the possession of whose descendants it remained until July 1891, when it was bought by Lord Donington.

Marriage and children
Hungerford married three times. His first marriage was before 1658 to Jane Hele, a daughter of Sir John Hele of Clifton Maybank, Dorset. She died on 18 March 1664 and was buried at Farleigh. By her he had one son, Edward (died September 1689), who married in 1680, at the age of 19, to Lady Alathea Compton. Hungerford also had two daughters by Jane: Frances, and Rachel (died 2 February 1732). In March 1684 Rachel married Clotworthy Skeffington, third Viscount Massereene, and on her death she left to her eldest son portraits of her father, of her granduncle (another Sir Edward Hungerford), and of other relations.

His second marriage was on 3 February 1666 to Jane Culme (1637–1674); and his third marriage, to Jane Gerard, née Digby (died 1703) was in July 1679. Both these marriages were childless.

Death
In his old age Hungerford is stated to have become a poor knight of Windsor. He died in 1711 and was buried in the church of St. Martin's-in-the-Fields. With the death of Sir Edward, the notable history of the family of Hungerford of Farleigh practically closes.

Notes

References

Attribution

Hoare's Hungerfordiana, 1823;
Jackson's Guide to Farleigh-Hungerford, 1853;
Gent. Mag. 1832, pt. ii. 113-15;
Burke's Extinct Peerage, s.v. 'Hungerford of Heytesbury;' Burke's Vicissitudes of Families, 1st ser.;
Notes and Queries, 5th ser. ii. 293.

Further reading
D Brunton & D H Pennington, Members of the Long Parliament (London: George Allen & Unwin, 1954)
Concise Dictionary of National Biography (1930)
Burke, Sir Bernard, Vicissitudes of Families, relates the downfall of the Hungerford family

1632 births
1711 deaths
People of the Rye House Plot
Knights of the Bath
English MPs 1659
English MPs 1660
English MPs 1661–1679
English MPs 1679
English MPs 1680–1681
English MPs 1681
English MPs 1685–1687
English MPs 1689–1690
English MPs 1690–1695
English MPs 1695–1698
English MPs 1698–1700
English MPs 1701
English MPs 1702–1705
Edward